The third annual Altazor Awards took place on March 25, 2002, at the Museo Nacional de Bellas Artes.

Nominations
Winners are in bold text.

Literary Arts

Narrative 
 Carlos Cerda  – Escrito con L
 Poli Délano  – Rompiendo Las Reglas 
 Pedro Lemebel  – Tengo Miedo Torero 
 Carolina Rivas  – Dama en el Jardín
 José Miguel Varas  – Cuentos Completos

Poetry 
 Juan Cameron  – Versos atribuidos al joven Francisco María Arouet y otros textos desclasificados
 Tomas Harris  – Encuentro con Hombres Oscuros
 Armando Roa Vial  – Estancias en Homenaje a Gregorio Samsa 
 Armando Uribe  – A peor Vida

Essay 
 Carla Cordua  – Ideas y Ocurrencias
 Carlos Franz  – La Muralla enterrada. Santiago Ciudad Imaginaria
 Alfredo Jocelyn-Holt  – Holt "Historia General de Chile. Tomo I El Retorno de los Dioses
 Armando Uribe  – Fantasma de la Sinrazón y el secreto de la poesía

Visual Arts

Painting 
 José Balmes  – Informe 
 Carlos Maturana (Bororo)  – Bororo Sobre Papel
 Ülrich Welss  – Ülrich Welss 1970-2001
 Ricardo Yrarrázaval  – Paisajes

Sculpture 
 Vicente Gajardo  – Cohabitaciones
 Pilar Ovalle  – Objetuales
 Osvaldo Peña  – Gestos Patrimoniales

Engraving and Drawing 
 Jaime Cruz  – Grabados de la Década 1991 -2001
 Klaudio Vidal  – Por sus Grabados en la Exposición "Intensificar" 
 Ricardo Yrarrázaval  – Oleos y Grabados

Installation art and Video art 
 Claudia Aravena and Guillermo Cifuentes  – Lugar Común
 Claudio Correa and Sebastián Preece  – Sala de Oficio
 Josefina Fontecilla  – Crónicas de la Materia 
 Carlos Leppe  – Fatiga de Material

Photography 
 Alvaro Larco  – La Mirada Transeúnte
 Miguel Sayago  – Pintores Chilenos
 Tito Vásquez  – Retrospectiva

Performing Arts Theatre

Dramaturgy 
 Jorge Díaz  – El Desvarío
 Benjamín Galemiri  – Edipo Asesor
 Elsa Pobrete  – Las Morla

Director 
 Mauricio Celedón  – Alice Underground
 Alejandro Goic  – Nadie es Profeta en su Espejo
 Raúl Osorio  – El Círculo de Tiza Caucasiano
 Andrés Pérez  – La Huida
 Luis Ureta  – Edipo Asesor

Actor 
 Luciano Cruz-Coke  – Largo viaje del día hacia la noche
 Rodolfo Pulgar  – El censor
 Alejandro Trejo  – Nadie es Profeta en su Espejo
 Tomás Vidiella  – Largo viaje del día hacia la noche

Actress 
 Heidrum Breier  – Historias de Familia
 Mabel Farías  – El encuentro de Irene
 María Izquierdo  – Los Ojos Rotos
 Gloria Münchmeyer  – Largo Viaje del Día hacia la Noche

Performing Arts Dance

Choreography 
 Gigi Caciuleanu  – Gente 
 Daniela Marini  – Alto Contraste
 Esteban Peña  – Memoria De Quipu
 Renato Peralta  – La Granja de Don Renato

Male Dancer 
 Andrés Maulén  – Vértigo
 César Morales  – Sueño de una Noche de Verano
 Luis Ortigoza  – Diana y Acteón
 César Sepúlveda  – Gente

Female Dancer 
 Carola Alvear  – 20 Poemas y una canción 
 Natalia Berríos  – Sueño de una Noche de Verano
 Lidia Olmos  – Diana y Acteón
 Vivian Romo  – Gente

Musical Arts

Classical music 
 Alejandro Guarello  – Vikach I
 Cuarteto de Guitarras de Chile  – Joaquín Rodrigo. Concierto de Aranjuez, Concierto Madrigal. Concierto Andaluz
 Duet Miguel Villafruela and Rodrigo Kanamori  – Secuencias, Saxofones y Percusiones
 Rodolfo Fischer, Cecilia Frigerio, José Azócar, Sergio Gómez and Carmen Luisa Letelier  – National version of Madame Butterfly

Traditional music 
 Illapu  – El Grito de la Raza
 Carlos Jarufe  – Reina de mi Ciudad
 Los Santiaguinos  – Cueca Urbana
 Freddy Torrealba  – Claudia

Ballad 
 Cecilia Echenique  – Secreta Intimidad
 Soledad Guerrero  – Yo Soy Sol
 Pablo Herrera  – Sentado en la Vereda
 Fernando Ubiergo  – Acústico

Pop/Rock 
   – Cerrado con Llave
 Mauricio Redolés  – Redolés y Los Ex Animales Domésticos en Shile Vol I.
 Mamma Soul  – Fe
 Mandrácula  – Sexy

Alternative/Jazz 
 Jorge Campos  – Machi
 Pedro Greene  – Cormorán
 Pancho Molina y los Titulares  – Perseguidor
 Juan Antonio Sánchez  – Tonada en Sepia

Playing 
 Gustavo Bosch (Trumpet)
 Héctor Briceño (Trombone) 
 Jorge Díaz (Guitar)
 Pedro Greene (Percussion)

Media Arts Film

Dirección 
 Orlando Lübbert  – Taxi para tres
 Iván Osnovikoff and Bettina Perut  – Un Hombre Aparte
 Luis R. Vera  – Bastardos en el Paraíso
 Andrés Wood  – La Fiebre del Loco

Actor 
 Luis Dubó  – La Fiebre del Loco
 Fernando Gómez-Rovira  – Taxi para tres
 Daniel Muñoz  – Taxi para tres
 Alejandro Trejo  – Taxi para tres

Actress 
 Tamara Acosta  – La Fiebre del Loco
 María Izquierdo  – La Fiebre del Loco
 Loreto Moya  – La Fiebre del Loco
 Amparo Noguera  – Un ladrón y su mujer

Creative Contribution 
 Cecilia Barriga (Mise en scène of Time's Up) 
 Miguel Joan Littin (Director of Photography of La Fiebre del Loco)
 Carmen Luz Parot (Historic Register of Estadio Nacional)
 Bettina Perut and Iván Osnovikoff (Editing of Un hombre Aparte)

Media Arts TV

Director 
 Paola Castillo  – Cine Video + Teatro
 María Eugenia Rencoret  – Amores de mercado
 Vicente Sabatini  – Pampa Ilusión

Screenplay 
 Víctor Carrasco, Larissa Contreras, María José Galleguillos and Alexis Moreno  – Pampa Ilusión
 Alejandro Cabrera, Arnaldo Madrid, René Arcos and Marcelo Leonart  – Amores de mercado
 Gregorio González, Pablo Perelman, Juan Andrés Condon, Santiago Yazigi, Gastón Roca and Enrique Artigas  – Los Patiperros
 Antonio Skármeta, Paola Castillo and Valeria Vargas  – El Show de los Libros

Actor 
 Néstor Cantillana  – Pampa Ilusión
 Luciano Cruz-Coke  – Amores de mercado
 Héctor Noguera  – Pampa Ilusión
 Mauricio Pesutic  – Amores de mercado
 Álvaro Rudolphy  – Amores de mercado

Actress 
 Claudia Cabezas  – Pampa Ilusión
 Claudia Di Girólamo  – Pampa Ilusión
 Solange Lackington  – Piel Canela
 Patricia López  – Amores de mercado

Creative Contribution 
 Daniel Alcaíno and Jorge López (Characters Creation)
 Augusto Góngora and computer maker of Cine Video + Teatro
 Iván Núñez and computer maker of El Termómetro

References

Chilean awards